Tomás Martínez (born 7 June 1995) is an Argentine footballer who plays as an attacking midfielder for Melgar.

Club career

River Plate 
Born in Béccar, Martínez joined River Plate's youth setup in 2001, after starting out at Atlético Béccar. In July 2011 he signed his first professional contract, with a €10 million clause after being linked to Arsenal and FC Barcelona.

On 24 April 2013 Martínez made his first team debut, coming on as a second-half substitute for Mauro Díaz in a 0–1 Copa Argentina home loss against Estudiantes Buenos Aires. He made his Primera División debut on 23 June, starting in a 3–1 home win against San Martín San Juan.

In 2014 Martínez made 4 appearances in the Copa Sudamericana to help River win their first continental tournament in 17 years. However he only made 9 league appearances on the season.

Because chances with the first team were limited, on 18 August 2015 Martínez was loaned to Segunda División side CD Tenerife, in a season-long deal.

In February 2016, River Plate cancelled the loan with CD Tenerife and sent Martínez on loan to Primera División club Defensa y Justicia. He would make his debut for Defensa y Justicia on 7 February against Unión de Santa Fe and scored his first ever Primera División goal on 17 February against Atlético de Rafaela. Martínez would find more success back in Argentina then he did in Spain, scoring 3 and picking up 2 assists for Defensa y Justicia.

SC Braga 
On 2 July 2016, River Plate sold Martínez to Primeira Liga club SC Braga. He would make his Braga debut on 22 August against Rio Ave.  Martínez made his European debut on 29 August in a 2–0 defeat to Shakhtar Donetsk in a Europa League match.  However, Martínez would struggled to find playing time, only making 2 more league appearances with the first team. He would spend the second half of the season with the club's second team, Braga B.

Houston Dynamo 
Martínez signed with the Houston Dynamo of Major League Soccer on 17 July 2017 as a young designated player. He would make his Dynamo debut on 12 August, coming on as a sub against the San Jose Earthquakes. He scored his first goal with the Dynamo against the LA Galaxy on 27 September. In the 2018 MLS Cup Playoffs, Martínez played in every game for the Dynamo and picked up an assist as the Dynamo reached the Western Conference Finals. However he picked up a red card in the final game that forced him to miss the first game of the 2018 season.

Although the Dynamo missed the playoffs in 2018, Martínez enjoyed the most productive season of his career. He finished the year as the Dynamo's team leader in assists with 13 Martínez got his first ever MLS regular season assist on 10 March against the Vancouver Whitecaps. He picked up a goal and assist on 14 April against the Earthquakes and made his first ever MLS team of the weak as a result of his strong performance. Martínez played in 4 games and recorded an assist in the US Open Cup as he helped the Dynamo win their first Open Cup in club history. On 28 October, he picked up 2 assists as the Dynamo came back from 2–0 down to defeat the Galaxy 3–2, eliminating the Galaxy from the playoffs.

Martínez made his CONCACAF Champions League 19 February in a 1–0 win over C.D. Guastatoya.  He picked up his first assist of the year on 9 March in a 2–1 over the Montreal Impact.  Martínez scored his first goal of the season on 13 April, curling in a left footed shot to the side netting to give Houston a 2–1 win over San Jose.  He would find the back of the net again on 27 April, this time hitting a half volley with his left foot into the left corner in a 2–0 Houston win against the Columbus Crew. On 11 June, Martínez picked up a goal an assist to help Houston get a 3–2 win over Austin Bold in a US Open Cup match. On June 18, he would find the back of the net in their next Open Cup match, however the Dynamo would lose 3–2 to Minnesota United.  Martínez enjoyed his most productive month of the season in July, scoring goals in Dynamo wins against New York Red Bulls and Toronto FC as well as picking up an assist in a 3–1 defeat to LAFC.  He would in the season with 7 goals and 4 assists in 37 appearances across all competitions  as the Dynamo finished 10th in the Western Conference, missing out on the playoffs for the second straight season.

Prior to the 2020 season, the Dynamo hired Tab Ramos as head coach, replacing Wilmer Cabrera, who had been in charge for the previous 3 seasons.  Ramos primarily used lineups without a central attacking midfielder, reducing the opportunities for Martínez to play in his preferred position.  Martínez ended the season having made only 11 appearances, 3 of them starts, with no goals or assists.  Despite the change in coach and tactics, on field results didn't improve, with Houston missing the playoffs for the third consecutive year.

His contract option was declined by Houston following their 2020 season.

Defensa y Justicia 
On 30 January 2021, Martínez signed with Defensa y Justicia of the Argentine Primera División.

Aldosivi
On 5 January 2022, Martínez moved to fellow league club Aldosivi.

Personal 
Martínez received his U.S. green card in January 2019, which qualifies him as a domestic player for MLS roster purposes.

Career Statistics

Honours
River Plate
 Argentina Primera Division: 2014 Final
 Copa Sudamericana: 2014

Houston Dynamo
 US Open Cup: 2018

Argentina U20
 South American Youth Football Championship: 2015

References

External links
 
 
 
 
 
 

1995 births
Living people
Sportspeople from Buenos Aires Province
Argentine footballers
Argentine expatriate footballers
Association football midfielders
2015 South American Youth Football Championship players
Argentina under-20 international footballers
Designated Players (MLS)
Club Atlético River Plate footballers
Defensa y Justicia footballers
CD Tenerife players
S.C. Braga players
Houston Dynamo FC players
Aldosivi footballers
FBC Melgar footballers
Argentine Primera División players
Segunda División players
Primeira Liga players
Major League Soccer players
Argentine expatriate sportspeople in Spain
Argentine expatriate sportspeople in Portugal
Argentine expatriate sportspeople in the United States
Expatriate footballers in Spain
Expatriate footballers in Portugal
Expatriate soccer players in the United States